Hochkirch (German) or Bukecy (Upper Sorbian) is a municipality in the district of Bautzen, in Saxony, Germany. It is known for the 1758 Battle of Hochkirch, part of the Seven Years' War.

The municipality (except Breitendorf) is part of the recognized Sorbian settlement area in Saxony. Upper Sorbian has an official status next to German, all villages bear names in both languages.

Geography
Situated within the Lusatian Highlands, it belongs to the settlement area of the Sorbs.

History

The village of Bukovici (possibly derived from Upper Sorbian buk: "beech") was first mentioned in a 1222 deed issued by Bishop Bruno II of Meissen; the present German name first appeared in 1368. By the 1635 Peace of Prague, the area passed to the Electorate of Saxony.

During the Seven Years' War on 14 October 1758, the Habsburg (Austrian) Imperial Army under Field Marshal Count Leopold Joseph von Daun attacked the Prussian forces of King Frederick II in a gruesome dawn attack in which many soldiers were bayonetted in their tents in an alleyway beside the village cemetery, called  Blutgasse (Blood Alley). The Prussians suffered a bitter defeat; Frederick's field marshal James Francis Edward Keith was killed in battle; his brother-in-law was decapitated by a cannonball. The church yard and church were the scene of intense fighting and the doors of the Baroque Hochkirch parish church still show pock marks from musket balls.

Politics
Seats in the municipal assembly (Gemeinderat) as of 2014 local elections:
Free Voters: 7
Christian Democratic Union of Germany (CDU): 6
The Left: 1

Notable people
Kito Lorenc (1938–2017), Sorbian writer, lyric poet and translator.

External links

References 

Populated places in Bautzen (district)